Milton is a federal electoral district in Ontario, Canada, that consists of the town of Milton and part of Burlington which has a population growing much faster than the Ontario average. It was created by the 2012 federal redistribution and previously part of Halton. Redistributed results showed that Conservative Lisa Raitt won the area easily in 2011, although her vote share dropped in the 2015 election and the Liberals took the riding in 2019. Since 2019 it has been represented by Liberal Adam van Koeverden.

Profile
The riding (electoral district) in its current form consists of the part of Burlington north of Dundas Street and Highway 407 and the town of Milton. The eponymous town, which makes up much of the riding's area, is a quickly-growing settlement which dates back to the 1820s. According to the 2016 Census, the population of the riding grew over six times as much as the Ontario average between 2011 and 2016, from 88,065 to 114,093 (a 29.6% increase compared to the provincial average of 4.6%). Over a third of the riding's population are immigrants. In 2015, the median income in the riding was $42,779, up from $41,801 in 2010. The median age in the district is 36, below the Ontario average of 41.

Demographics

''According to the Canada 2021 Census; 2013 representation

Languages: 56.3% English, 9.4% Urdu, 4% Arabic, 2.3% Spanish, 1.8% Punjabi, 1.5% Tagalog, 1.3% Polish, 1.2% Portugese, 1.1% French, 1.1% Hindi, 1.1% Mandarin
Religions: 48.4% Christian (27.9% Catholic, 3.1% Christian Orthodox, 2.6% Anglican, 2% United Church, 1.4% Pentecostal, 1.1% Presbyterian), 22.6% Muslim, 19.4% No religion, 5.9% Hindu, 2.4% Sikh
Median income (2020): $46,000 
Average income (2020): $60,000

Ethnicity groups: White: 45.3%, South Asian: 27.6%, Black: 5.7%, Arab: 5.6%, Filipino: 3.9%, Chinese: 2.8%, Latin American: 2.5%, West Asian: 1.3%, Southeast Asian: 1%

Ethnic origins: Pakistani 11.9%, English 11.5%, Indian 10.6%, Scottish 9.6%, Irish 9.2%, Canadian 8.9%, Italian 5.8%, German 4.7%, Filipino 4%, Portugese 3.9%

History

The district was first proposed as part of the 2012 redistribution. It was initially proposed to consist of Milton, the rural northern part of Burlington, and some small suburban areas of Burlington. There was some concern that the growth of Milton would cause it to be seriously underrepresented by 2031. Before the public meetings were scheduled to be held, the commission redrew the districts in the area and the district would now be split. Burlington North—Milton South would consist of southern Milton and a few more suburban neighbourhoods in Burlington. In the north, it would be combined with Halton Hills to form Halton Hills—Milton.

In February 2013, the district was reverted to the original proposal, but with the northern suburbs of Burlington excluded. This proposal ended up being approved. The area of this district was previously part of Halton and had a population of 88,065, 17% below the provincial average.

In the 2011 election, Conservative MP Lisa Raitt won Halton by about 29% of the vote, and when redistributed, she won Milton by 31%. In the 2015 election, her margin of victory over the Liberal candidate declined to 5%. Shortly after the election, in which the Conservatives lost government, Prime Minister Stephen Harper resigned as party leader; his interim replacement Rona Ambrose appointed Raitt to the Shadow Cabinet as Finance critic. After Raitt spent time outside of the shadow cabinet during her leadership bid, the new full-time leader Andrew Scheer appointed her to be Deputy Leader of the Conservative Party in 2017.

In January 2019, the Liberals nominated former Olympian Adam van Koeverden to run in the riding. A riding poll was released in the lead-up to the election showing a tight race, and it was expected that it would turn out that way on election night. Despite this, van Koeverden won the riding's seat in Parliament against Raitt by 15% of the vote and won a majority of votes in the riding. This was one of only two ridings in the country Liberals picked up from the Conservatives in the 2019 election.

Members of Parliament

This riding has elected the following Members of Parliament:

Election results

References

Ontario federal electoral districts
Milton, Ontario
Politics of Burlington, Ontario
2013 establishments in Ontario